Vasile Ilarionovici Coșelev (born 12 February 1972 in Chișinău) is a former Moldovan football player.

Between 1992–1999 Vasile Coșelev has played 23 matches for Moldova national football team.

References

External links
 
 

1972 births
Footballers from Chișinău
Living people
FC Zimbru Chișinău players
Soviet footballers
CSF Bălți players
SKA Odesa players
Moldovan footballers
Moldova international footballers
CS Tiligul-Tiras Tiraspol players
FC Tiraspol players
FC Spumante Cricova players
PFC Krylia Sovetov Samara players
Moldovan expatriate footballers
Russian Premier League players
FC Elista players
FC Rapid Ghidighici players
Association football goalkeepers
FC Dynamo Vologda players
FC Sodovik Sterlitamak players
FC Chita players